Yoshinobu Fujishima (born 4 November 1939) is a Japanese weightlifter. He competed in the men's featherweight event at the 1960 Summer Olympics.

References

1939 births
Living people
Japanese male weightlifters
Olympic weightlifters of Japan
Weightlifters at the 1960 Summer Olympics
Sportspeople from Tokushima Prefecture
20th-century Japanese people